In differential geometry, the Willmore energy is a quantitative measure of how much a given surface deviates from a round sphere.  Mathematically, the Willmore energy of a smooth closed surface embedded in three-dimensional Euclidean space is defined to be the integral of the square of the mean curvature minus the Gaussian curvature.  It is named after the English geometer Thomas Willmore.

Definition
Expressed symbolically, the Willmore energy of S is:

where  is the mean curvature,  is the Gaussian curvature, and dA is the area form of S.  For a closed surface, by the Gauss–Bonnet theorem, the integral of the Gaussian curvature may be computed in terms of the Euler characteristic  of the surface, so

which is a topological invariant and thus independent of the particular embedding in  that was chosen.  Thus the Willmore energy can be expressed as

An alternative, but equivalent, formula is

Properties
The Willmore energy is always greater than or equal to zero.  A round sphere has zero Willmore energy.

The Willmore energy can be considered a functional on the space of embeddings of a given surface, in the sense of the calculus of variations, and one can vary the embedding of a surface, while leaving it topologically unaltered.

Critical points
A basic problem in the calculus of variations is to find the critical points and minima of a functional.

For a given topological space, this is equivalent to finding the critical points of the function

since the Euler characteristic is constant.

One can find (local) minima for the Willmore energy by gradient descent, which in this context is called Willmore flow.

For embeddings of the sphere in 3-space, the critical points have been classified: they are all conformal transforms of minimal surfaces, the round sphere is the minimum, and all other critical values are integers greater than or equal to 4. They are called Willmore surfaces.

Willmore flow
The Willmore flow is the geometric flow corresponding to the Willmore energy;
it is an -gradient flow.

where H stands for the mean curvature of the manifold .

Flow lines satisfy the differential equation:

where  is a point belonging to the surface.

This flow leads to an evolution problem in differential geometry: the surface  is evolving 
in time to follow variations of steepest descent of the energy. Like surface diffusion it is a fourth-order 
flow, since the variation of the energy contains fourth derivatives.

Applications
 Cell membranes tend to position themselves so as to minimize Willmore energy.
 Willmore energy is used in constructing a class of optimal sphere eversions, the minimax eversions.

See also
 Willmore conjecture

Notes

References
.

Geometric flow
Differential geometry
Surfaces